Dmitri Olegovich Sokolov (born 1 March 1988) is a Russian former professional footballer.

External links
 
  Career profile at Footballfacts

1988 births
People from Tomsk Oblast
Living people
Russian footballers
Russia youth international footballers
Association football midfielders
Russian Premier League players
FC Torpedo Moscow players
FC Amkar Perm players
FC Sokol Saratov players
FC Khimki players
FC Fakel Voronezh players
FC Tom Tomsk players
FC Khimik Dzerzhinsk players
Sportspeople from Tomsk Oblast